William Andrew Jones (February 18, 1907 – March 5, 1974), better known as Billy De Wolfe, was an American character actor.  He was active in films from the mid-1940s until his death in 1974.

Early life and early stage career
Born William Andrew Jones in the Wollaston neighborhood of Quincy, Massachusetts, De Wolfe was the son of a Welsh bookbinder who encouraged him to become a Baptist minister. Instead, Billy developed an interest in the theatre. He found work as an usher before becoming a dancer with the Jimmy O'Connor Band. It was at this point that he changed his last name initially to "De Wolf" (the e was added later), which was the last name of the manager of the Massachusetts theatre where he worked. In 1925, De Wolfe landed chorus boy spots in the Broadway musicals Artists and Models and The Cocoanuts. He then went on to tour Europe with a dance team for most of the 1930s, appearing in a London revue called "Revels in Rhythm" and "danced before royalty on nine continents." During World War II, he served in the United States Navy until he was discharged in 1944 for medical reasons, due to a reported arthritic condition.

Films
De Wolfe signed with Paramount Pictures in 1943 and became a reliable comedian. His pencil-mustached and often pompous character contrasted humorously with the films' romantic leads. His best-known role of his Paramount tenure is probably the ham actor-turned-silent movie villain in the 1947 fictionalized Pearl White biography  The Perils of Pauline.  De Wolfe became known for his portrayal of fussy, petty men ("Never touch!," he would say imperiously whenever someone accosted him physically). The New York Times review of his 1948 film Isn't It Romantic? strongly criticized the way the other actors' material limited their performances, contrasting their performances with his: "But Mr. De Wolfe is nothing daunted. He rips up the place with great delight. The material is at his mercy. Likewise the scenery. And he chews it to bits."

De Wolfe was a good friend of Doris Day for over two decades, from the time of their first meeting during the filming of the 1950 musical Tea for Two until his death. Their screen chemistry in that film led to De Wolfe being quickly recast as a supporting character of Day in the 1951 production Lullaby of Broadway.

Return to stage and television work
After his Paramount contract lapsed, De Wolfe returned to the stage. He appeared in the revue John Murray Anderson's Almanac in 1953 and 1954, and starred in the last edition of the Ziegfeld Follies, in 1957.

He appeared regularly in guest roles on television, including the first two episodes of NBC's The Imogene Coca Show. He portrayed Mr. Jarvis on CBS's The Doris Day Show, and co-starred with Larry Storch in a short-lived TV sitcom, The Queen and I. He often appeared on talk shows and in TV commercials, doing his "Mrs. Murgatroyd" drag routine. Wearing a hat and a shawl (but still sporting his mustache), De Wolfe (as old maid Phoebe Murgatroyd) would claim to be an expert on romance and answered questions from the lovelorn.

Generations of TV viewers know Billy De Wolfe only by his voice, such as the voice of the finicky but inept magician Professor Hinkle in the animated 1969 Christmas special Frosty the Snowman. That supporting character speaks with De Wolfe's precise but exaggerated diction: "Mess-y, mess-y, mess-y! Sill-y, sill-y, sill-y! Bus-y, bus-y, bus-y!"

In 1967–68 (one season, 26 episodes), he co-starred with Joby Baker and Ronnie Schell in the TV sitcom Good Morning World as Roland Hutton, the fussy manager at a radio station where David Lewis and Larry Clarke (Baker and Schell) are co-hosts.

In 1972, De Wolfe was scheduled to return to Broadway in the role of Madame Lucy in the musical revival of Irene starring Debbie Reynolds, Monte Markham, Ruth Warrick, and Patsy Kelly. During the early stages of rehearsals, however, DeWolfe learned that he was ill with cancer and was replaced by George S. Irving. Nevertheless, later that same year, De Wolfe recorded a vocal track for songs presented on the album Free to Be... You and Me, which was part of a children's entertainment project developed by actress and author Marlo Thomas. A related animated special was subsequently produced for television and aired on ABC on March 11, 1974, just six days after De Wolfe's death.

Personal life and death
De Wolfe never married, and personal aspects about his life were rarely mentioned publicly during his career. His "closeted" homosexuality, however, is mentioned or alluded to in various publications, including in the 2004 volume Sir John Gielgud: A Life in Letters, in a 2010 biography of actress Doris Day by author David Kaufman, and in a 1998 article by Bruce Vilanch titled "America's favorite fruit" and featured in The Advocate.

On February 26, 1974, suffering from an advanced case of lung cancer, De Wolfe was admitted to the University of California at Los Angeles Medical Center. He died there a week later, on March 5, just two weeks after his 67th birthday.

Filmography

References
Notes

External links

 
 
 
 

1907 births
1974 deaths
20th-century American male actors
American male film actors
American male stage actors
American male television actors
American male voice actors
United States Navy personnel of World War II
American people of Welsh descent
Deaths from lung cancer
Donaldson Award winners
American gay actors
Male actors from Massachusetts
People from Quincy, Massachusetts
LGBT people from Massachusetts
20th-century American LGBT people